Kabud Khani, also rendered as Kabudkhaneh, may refer to:
 Kabud Khani-ye Olya
 Kabud Khani-ye Sofla